Karen Banks is a British computer networking pioneer who was inducted to the Internet Hall of Fame in 2013 as a "Global Connector".

Life 
In the 1990s she maintained GnFido, a pioneering gateway run by non-profit ISP GreenNet, which used store and forward techniques to provide otherwise unavailable internet access for individuals and organisations across Africa, South Asia and Eastern Europe.GreenNet was a founder member of the Association for Progressive Communications (APC), and Banks was one of the founders of its Women's Networking Support Programme (WNSP) in 1993 and its coordinator 1996-2004. At the United Nations Fourth World Conference on Women in 1995 the WNSP provided web access and email for 10,000 delegates, many of whom had never seen a web page before. From 1998 to 2001 Banks coordinated APC's global Internet rights work in Europe, and she became network development manager in 2004. She is now APC's operations director. 

In 2004 she was given the Anita Borg Award for Social Impact by the Anita Borg Institute, in recognition of "significant and sustained contributions in technology".

She is a board member of Privacy International

On 16 November 2018 Banks was recognised with the Oxford Internet Institute Award  for her lifetime achievements in using information and communication technologies for social change.

See also 

 History of the Internet
 Internet in the United Kingdom § History

References

Year of birth missing (living people)
Living people
Women Internet pioneers
British women computer scientists